The National Survey of Fishing, Hunting, and Wildlife-Associated Recreation (Survey) has been sponsored since 1955 by the U.S. Fish and Wildlife Service and is one of the oldest and most comprehensive continuing recreation surveys. The most recent Survey (2006) found that 87.5 million U.S. residents 16 years old and older participated in wildlife-related recreation and spent $122.3 billion on their activities.  During that year, 30.0 million people fished, 12.5 million hunted, and 71.1 million participated in at least one type of wildlife-watching activity such as observing, feeding, or photographing birds and other wildlife in the United States.

Data Collected

The Survey collects information on the number of anglers, hunters, and wildlife watchers; how often they participate; and how much they spend on their activities in the United States.  The most recent Survey focuses on 2006 participation and expenditures by persons 16 years of age and older.  The information is presented at both the national and state level.
In addition to 2006 estimates, the Survey also provides trend information that can be directly compared with results from the 1991, 1996, and 2001 Survey reports.  Due to methodological changes to improve accuracy, results from Surveys conducted earlier than 1991 should not be directly compared.

Fishing

Three types of fishing are reported: (1) freshwater, excluding Great Lakes, (2) Great Lakes, and (3) saltwater.  Anglers include not only licensed hook and line anglers, but also those who have no license and those who use special methods such as fishing with spears.  Results are given for total participants, days of participation, number of trips, and expenditures.

Hunting

Four types of hunting are reported: (1) big game, (2) small game, (3) migratory bird, and (4) other animals.  Hunters include not only licensed hunters using rifles and shotguns but also those who had no license and those who hunted with a bow and arrow, primitive firearm, or pistol or handgun. Results are given for total participants, days of participation, number of trips, and expenditures.

Wildlife Watching

Two types of wildlife watching are reported: (1) away-from-home (formally nonresidential) activities and (2) around-the-home (formally residential) activities.  The 2006 Survey uses a strict definition of wildlife watching.  Participants must either take a "special interest" in wildlife around their homes or take a trip for the "primary purpose" of wildlife watching.  Secondary wildlife watching, such as incidentally observing wildlife while pleasure driving, is not included.  Results are given for total participants, days of participation, number of trips, and expenditures.

Demographic Data

The Survey also collects demographic data for anglers, hunters and wildlife watchers.  This information is broken down into a select group of characteristics including density of residence, size of residence, geographic region, age, sex, ethnicity, race, income, and education.

Uses of the Survey

The Service provides reports, brochures, news releases, speeches, and interviews about current use and trend information with the Survey results.  Other Federal agencies, like land managing and water development agencies, use the data on participation rates, species sought, and types of resources used to formulate policies, programs, and plans related to recreational fish and wildlife uses. Federal regulatory, permitting, and environmental agencies rely on the economic data for estimating damages to fish and wildlife resources, and for determining the benefits and costs of projects affecting natural resources.  Data are used in evaluating alternative plans and their environmental impacts. 
State fish and wildlife agencies, in conjunction with their fishery and wildlife sections, use the Survey data for program planning, development, management, and evaluation.  
Other non-federal conservation organizations, researchers, and trade and manufacturing associations rely on the Survey data too. They also participate in identifying priorities for data collection and streamlining.

See also
 List of household surveys in the United States

External links
 US Fish And Wildlife Service - More detailed information about the Service
 National Survey of Fishing, Hunting, and Wildlife-Associated Recreation -More detailed information about the survey

United States Fish and Wildlife Service